Claudia Myers is an American screenwriter, director and producer. In addition, she is an Associate Professor of Film and Media at American University's School of Communication.

Early life 
Myers received an M.F.A from Columbia University's School of the Arts and a BA from Yale University.

Career

Buddy & Grace
In 2001, she co-wrote and directed the film Buddy & Grace. The romantic drama tells the story of an elderly man struggling with his wife who suffers with Alzheimer's. The film was screened at several festivals including Sundance Film Festival and Los Angeles International Film Festival. It also won the Student Grant Award as part of the National Board of Review.

Kettle of Fish 
Myers wrote and directed the film Kettle of Fish in 2006. A romantic comedy of a womanizing and commitment-phobic saxophonist (Matthew Modine) in co-habitation with a research biologist (Gina Gershon). The film was a part of the Tribeca Film Festival in 2006.

Fort Bliss 
In 2014 Myers wrote and directed the film Fort Bliss. Fort Bliss is a film about an army medic and single mother Maggie Swann (portrayed by Michelle Monaghan) struggling to readjust to life with her family after a tour in Afghanistan. The film won the Audience Award at the 2014 Champs-Élysées Film Festival. After the release, Independent Magazine named Myers one of the '10 Filmmakers to Watch in 2015'.

Above the Shadows 
Myers went on to write and direct the 2019 film Above the Shadows. The film is about a young woman (Olivia Thirlby) who has faded to the point of becoming invisible and must find her way back with the help of the one man who can see her.

Filmography

References

External links 
 
 http://claudiamyersfilms.com/

American women screenwriters
American women film directors
Living people
Year of birth missing (living people)
American University faculty and staff
Yale University alumni
Columbia University School of the Arts alumni
American women academics
21st-century American women